Korea Post is the national postal service of South Korea, under the authority of the Ministry of Science and ICT, formerly Ministry of Knowledge Economy until 2013. Korea Post is in charge of postal service, postal banking, and insurance services. Its headquarters are in Sejong City.

Functions 
Korea Post is charged with providing the following postal and financial services at post offices:
 Basic postal service (handling and delivering mail and parcels)
 Additional postal services (registered mail, customer pickup, P.O. Box, sales of local products by mail order and postal errand service)
 Postal savings, money orders and postal giro
 Postal insurance.

Organization 
 Two divisions with four bureaus
 Affiliated agencies:
 Korea Post Officials Training Institute
 Korea Post Information Centre
 Supply and Construction Office of Korea Post
 Regional Communications Offices in Seoul, Gyeongin, Busan, Chungcheong, Jeonnam, Gyeongbuk, Jeongbuk, Kangwon, Jeju
 3,631 post offices

Investments 
Korea Post invests in a wide variety of assets.  In 2016, Korea Post invested in its first French property.

See also 
Postage stamps and postal history of South Korea
South Korean postal codes

References

External links 
Korea Post 
ePost 

Government agencies of South Korea
Postal system of South Korea
Korea, South
South Korean companies established in 2000
South Korean brands